The blodite group (or Blödite group) is a group of minerals with two (in most cases divalent) cations and two anions. The group includes blödite Na2Mg(SO4)2•4H2O, leonite K2Mg(SO4)2•4(H2O), anapaite Ca2Fe(PO4)2•4(H2O), schertelite (NH4)2Mg(PO3OH)2•4(H2O,) manganoblödite Na2Mn(SO4)2•4(H2O), cobaltoblödite Na2Co(SO4) 2•4(H2O), changoiteNa2Zn(SO4)2•4(H2O)

References

Mineral groups